Android  12 is the twelfth major release and 19th version of Android, the mobile operating system developed by the Open Handset Alliance led by Google. The first beta was released on May 18, 2021. Android 12 was released publicly on October 4, 2021, through Android Open Source Project (AOSP) and was released to supported Google Pixel devices on October 19, 2021.

As of February 2023 Android 12 is the most popular version of Android, with 25.12% of devices having the operating system installed. The first phones to have Android 12 were the Google Pixel 6 and the Pixel 6 Pro.

History 

Android 12 (internally codenamed Snow Cone) was announced in an Android blog posted on February 18, 2021. A developer preview was released immediately, with two additional ones planned the following two months. After that, four monthly beta releases were planned, beginning in May, the last one of them reaching platform stability in August, with general availability coming shortly after that.

The second developer preview was released on March 17, 2021, followed by a third preview on April 21, 2021. The first beta build was then released on May 18, 2021. It was followed by beta 2 on June 9, 2021, which got a bugfix update to 2.1 on June 23. Then beta 3 was released on July 14, 2021, getting a bugfix update to beta 3.1 on July 26. Beta 4 was released on August 11, 2021. A fifth beta, not planned in the original roadmap, was released on September 8, 2021. Android 12 stable got released on the Android Open Source Project on October 4, getting its public over-the-air rollout on October 19, coinciding with the launch event for the Pixel 6.

Android 12.1/12L 
In October 2021, Google announced Android 12L, an interim release of Android 12 including improvements specific for foldable phones, tablets, desktop-sized screens and Chromebooks, and modifications to the user interface to tailor it to larger screens. It was planned to launch in early 2022. Developer Preview 1 of Android 12L was released in October 2021, followed by Beta 1 in December 2021, Beta 2 in January 2022, and Beta 3 in February 2022. The stable version of Android 12L was released for devices with large screens on March 7, 2022, and was released as "Android 12.1" for Pixel smartphones on the same date, besides the Pixel 6 & Pixel 6 Pro.

Features

User interface 
Android 12 introduces a major refresh to the operating system's Material Design language branded as "Material You", which features larger buttons, increased use of animation, and a new style for home screen widgets. A feature, internally codenamed "monet", allows the operating system to automatically generate a color theme for system menus and supported apps using the colors of the user's wallpaper. 

The smart home and Wallet areas added to the power menu on Android 11 have been relocated to the notification shade, while Google Assistant is now activated by holding the power button. Android 12 features native support for taking scrolling screenshots.

The screen magnifier feature now allows partial magnification via a floating window, and can also be configured to follow text inputs.

Platform 
Performance improvements have been made to system services such as the window and package managers. The Android Runtime has been added to Project Mainline, allowing it to be serviced via Play Store.

Android 12 adds support for spatial audio, and MPEG-H 3D Audio, and supports transcoding of HEVC video for backwards compatibility with apps which do not support it. A new API known as HapticGenerator allows the OS to generate haptic feedback from audio on compatible devices.

A "rich content insertion" API eases the ability to transfer formatted text and media between apps, such as via the clipboard. Third party app stores now have the ability to update apps without constantly asking the user for permission.

Privacy 
OS-level machine learning functions are sandboxed within the "Android Private Compute Core", which is expressly prohibited from accessing networks.

Apps requesting location data can now be restricted to having access only to "approximate" location data rather than "precise". Controls to prevent apps from using the camera and microphone system-wide have been added to the quick settings toggles. An indicator will also be displayed on-screen if they are active.

References

External links 
 
 
 Video: 60+ changes in Android 12

Android (operating system)
2021 software